Harduf (lit. Oleander) is a kibbutz in northern Israel. Located in the Lower Galilee, it falls under the jurisdiction of Jezreel Valley Regional Council.

History
The kibbutz was established in 1982 by Jesaiah Ben-Aharon and other followers of Rudolf Steiner, and was named after the oleander plants growing in the area. Kibbutz members live according to the anthroposophy philosophy. Harduf has several health centers: Beit Elisha, for rehabilitation of adults with special needs; the Tuvia community, for children and youth who have been removed from their homes and need a new foster family; and the Hiram, which seeks to help youths who suffer from emotional problems.

In 2007, Harduf cut off its local sewage from the national system, in order to cleanse the waste matter so it can be used for watering stalks and trees. The members plan to set up an ecological park on recycled water.

See also
Agriculture in Israel

References

External links
Kibbutz website

Kibbutzim
Kibbutz Movement
Populated places established in 1982
Anthroposophy
Populated places in Northern District (Israel)
1982 establishments in Israel